The aircraft listed here were all designed by the aircraft manufacturing company associated with Blohm & Voss shipbuilders of Hamburg, Germany. The company changed its name several times, from Hamburger Flugzeugbau GmbH to Blohm & Voss Abteilung Flugzeugbau, and back to Hamburger Flugzeugbau GmbH (HFB). Some types therefore carry designations for more than one name. Many of the company's design studies were never built but are nevertheless of significant technical or historical interest. Less significant designs, other company's types manufactured under contract and joint projects under other names are not listed. Blohm and Voss made planes for the luftwaffe.



List of aircraft

See also
List of aircraft § Blohm & Voss
List of aircraft § Hamburger Flugzeugbau
List of aircraft § HFB
List of German aircraft projects, 1939–45 § Blohm & Voss

Associated types 
These aircraft were built under the direction, in whole or in part, of B&V/HFB:
 Skoda-Kauba SK SL6, a modification of the SK V-6 with an outboard tail, to test the proposed control system for the P 208 tailless pusher fighter.
 FGP 227 quarter-scale flying test model of the Blohm & Voss BV 238 flying boat
 Transall C-160 joint venture transport.

References

Citations

Bibliography
Hugh Cowin; "Blohm und Voss Projects of World War II", Air Pictorial, Parts I-III, Oct-Dec 1963.
William Green; Warplanes of the Third Reich, 4th Impression, Macdonald and Jane's, 1979.
David Masters; German Jet Genesis, Jane's, 1982.
Dan Sharp; Luftwaffe: Secret Wings of the Third Reich; Mortons, 2017.

Blohm & Voss aircraft
Blohm